The 2015 Incarnate Word Cardinals football team represented the University of the Incarnate Word in the 2015 NCAA Division I FCS football season. The Cardinals were in their third transition season of collegiate football at the FCS level. They were led by fourth-year head coach Larry Kennan. This was the Cardinals second season with a full Southland Conference schedule since becoming members of the conference. They played their home games at Gayle and Tom Benson Stadium. They finished the season 6–5, 5–4 in Southland play to finish in fourth place.

TV and radio
All Incarnate Word games will be broadcast on CBS Sports Radio 860 AM with the voices of Gabe Farias and Shawn Morris. CBS Sports Radio 860 AM broadcasts will be available at their CBS Sports Radio 860 AM. KUIW Radio will also produce a student media broadcast every week, that will be available online, and they will provide streaming of all non-televised home games via UIWtv.

Previous season
The 2014 season marked the Cardinals's first season of Southland Conference play. They were led by third-year head coach Larry Kennan. Home games were played at Gayle and Tom Benson Stadium. They finished the season 2–9, 2–6 in Southland play.

Schedule
Source:

Personnel

Coaching staff

Roster
{| class="toccolours" style="text-align: left;"
|-
| colspan=11 style="; text-align: center"| 2015 Incarnate Word Cardinals Football
|-
|valign="top"|

Quarterback
 3  Taylor Woods – Senior (6'3, 205)
 4  Trent Brittain –   Sophomore (6'2, 205)
 5  Breylann McCollum –  Sophomore (6'2, 210)
 8  McLane Carter – Freshman (6'3, 195)
17  Jordan Scelfo –  Senior (5'10, 190)

Running Back
 7  Dorland Fields –  Freshman (5'9, 200)
20  Keshon Leonard –  Sophomore (5'7, 170)
24  Sean Flannel –  Junior (5'10, 190)
25  Broderick Reeves – Junior (5'9, 195)
26  Junior Sessions – Junior (5'10, 215)

Wide Receiver
 2  Jordan Hicks – Junior (5'8, 170)
 6  Lamont Johnson – Freshman (6'0, 170)
11  Clint Killough –  Senior (5'10, 180)
16  Daryl Brooks – Junior  (6'4, 195)
21  Stefon Martin –  Junior  (6'2, 195)
22  Jamari Gilbert –  Sophomore (6'2, 185)
80  Kaleb Hardy –  Sophomore (6'4, 215)
81  Kody Edwards – Junior (6'0, 165)
82  Taylor Hudson –  Senior (6'1, 190)
84  Trevor Smith – Senior (5'7, 175)
85  Anthony Marciano –  Freshman (5'11, 185)
86  Gabriel Taylor –  Senior (6'7, 215)
87  Dillon Manz – Freshman (6'2, 205)

Tight End
40  Luis Lopez – Freshman (6'4, 265)
45  Cole Wick – Senior (6'7, 255)
47  Josh Esukpa –  Junior (6'1, 245)
83  Thaddeus Greene – Junior (6'4, 215)
89  John Myers – Freshman (6'6, 240)

|width="25"| 
|valign="top"|	

H-Back
29  John Oglesby – Junior (6'1, 220)
44  Cyril Clarke –  Junior (6'1, 220)
46  Jamaal Ojo –  Junior (6'0, 225)

Offensive Line
53  Matt McCarthy – C –  Junior (6'3, 285)
57  Devyn Jensen – OG – Sophomore (6'3, 270)
60  Josh Esukpa – OL –  Sophomore (6'1, 260)
61  Draven Taylor – OT –  Sophomore (6'2, 298)
63  Tyler Preston – C –  Freshman (6'3, 300)
64  Roberto Limon – OG –  Freshman (6'3, 325)
68  Isaiah Carrizales – OL – Freshman (6'1, 225)
69  Trevor Mason – OT –  Junior (6'7, 290)
70  Nathan Thompson – OT – Senior (6'5, 300)
71  Aaron Rodriguez – OL – Freshman (6'3, 282)
74  Cameron Wilson – OT – Freshman (6'4, 290)
75  Jeremy Jones – OG – Freshman (6'5, 287)
76  Austin Jennings – OG –  Sophomore (6'4, 290)
77  Zach Fattig – OG – Junior (6'3, 285)

Defensive Line
54  Corey Lee – DE – Junior (6'0, 272)
55  Darius Montgomery – DE –  Freshman (6'2, 266)
59  Sam Hines – NT – “ Senior (6’0, 250)”
72  Phillip Higgins – DE – Freshman (6'0, 240)
88  Justin Roberts – DE – “ Sophomore (6’4, 255)”
91  Dallin Muti – NT –  Senior (5'11, 285)
93  Tyler Colbert – NT –  Sophomore (6'1, 300)
94  Phillip Franco – DL – “Freshman (6’0, 240)”
96  John Williams – NT – Freshman (6'2, 310)
97  Eric England – NT – Sophomore (6'0, 270)
98  Jawara Beasley – DE – Sophomore (6'3, 252)

|width="25"| 
|valign="top"|

Linebacker
 8  Myke Tavarres – OLB –  Senior (6'2, 220)
 9  Josh Zellars – ILB – Junior (6'0, 210)
15  Quandre Washington – ILB – Sophomore (6'1, 217)
19  Jerome McElroy – OLB/DE – “Senior (6’0, 240)”
33  Joel Higgins – ILB – Junior (6'0, 225)
34  Greg Lemon – OLB –  Sophomore (6'2, 235)
35  Padyn Giebler – ILB – “Senior (6’0, 230)”
43  Michael Allen – ILB – Junior (6'0, 210)
50  George Schwanenberg – ILB – Sophomore (5'11, 215)
51  Denzel Thomas – OLB – Sophomore (6'1, 225)
52  Israel Acuay – OLB –  Freshman (6'2, 245)
56  Noah McMeans – OLB – Freshman (6'4, 205)
65  Halston Draeger – OLB – “Freshman (6’0, 211)
66  West Lambert – ILB – Freshman (6'0, 220)
92  Blake Klumpp – OLB –  Freshman (6'3, 240)

Defensive Back
 1  Daryl Irby – CB –  Junior (5'10, 179)
10  Brandon Tanksley – S – Senior (6'2, 210)
12  Robert Johnson – S – Senior (6'0, 200)
13  Jeilyn Williams – CB – Sophomore (5'9, 170)
14  Jared Ambres – S –  Sophomore (6’0, 200)”
17  Sean Hoeferkamp – S – Sophomore (6'1, 201)18  Adrian Norwood Jr. – S – Junior (6'0, 205)23  Kobie Douglas – CB –  Senior (5'9, 162)27  Trey Colbert – S –  Junior (6'0, 210)28  Da’Shawn Brown-Key – DB – Freshman (6'1, 180)30  Jawun Jiles – S – Freshman (5'10, 193)31  Troy Lara – S –  Senior (5'11, 195)32  Jamarkese Williams – CB –  Freshman (6'3, 183)36  Shane Piatnik – S –  Freshman (6'0, 200)37  Damon Weaver – S – “Freshman (6’0, 190)
38  Tim McCoy – S –  Freshman (5'11, 195)48  David Nader – DB –  Sophomore (5'11, 200)Place Kicker
41  Cody Seidel – Freshman (6'2, 200)Punter
42  Chase Ellerbee – Freshman (6'2, 210)49  Ramon Coto, Jr. – “Sophomore (5’11, 240)”

|}

Depth chart

Postseason honors
The following Cardinals received postseason honors for the 2015 season:

Associated Press FCS All-America Second-Team
LB  Myke Tavarres - Senior

STATS FCS All-America First-Team
LB  Myke Tavarres - Senior

AFCA FCS All-America First-Team
LB  Myke Tavarres - Senior

All-Southland Conference First-Team 
TE  Cole Wick - Senior
LB  Myke Tavarres - Senior

All-Southland Conference Second-Team
DB  Kobie Douglas - Senior

All-Southland Conference Honorable Mention
QB  Trent Brittain - Sophomore
OL  Nathan Thompson - Senior
DE  Alex Jenkins - Junior
LB  Josh Zellars - Junior
DB  Robert Johnson - Senior
KR  Kody Edwards - Sophomore
PR  Jordan Hicks - Junior

Southland Conference Newcomer of the Year
LB  Myke Tavarres - Senior

NFLPA Collegiate Bowl Invitee
LB  Myke Tavarres - Senior

Southland Conference Academic All-Conference
QB  Trent Brittain - Sophomore
TE  Cole Wick - Senior
DE  Alex Jenkins - Junior
LB  Padyn Giebler - Senior
DB  Daryl Irby - Junior

CoSIDA Academic All-America First-Team
LB  Padyn Giebler - Senior

Game summaries

Texas A&M–Kingsville''
Sources: Box Score

@ McNeese State

Sources: Box Score

Nicholls State

Sources: Box Score

@ UTEP

Sources: Box Score

Northwestern State

Sources: Box Score

@ Sam Houston State

Sources: Box Score

Abilene Christian

Sources: Box Score

@ Stephen F. Austin

Sources: Box Score

@ Southeastern Louisiana

Sources: Box Score

Lamar

Sources: Box Score

@ Houston Baptist

Sources: Box Score

References

Incarnate Word
Incarnate Word Cardinals football seasons
Incarnate Word Cardinals football